Bab al-Louq (also Bab el-Louk, Bab al-Luq;) is a neighborhood in downtown Cairo.  The Egyptian Ministry of Interior is located there.

References 

Districts of Cairo